Granulicatella is a genus of bacteria from the family of Carnobacteriaceae. These bacteria occurs in the upper respiratory tract, in the gastrointestinal tract, and the urogenital tract. Granulicatella bacteria can cause disease in humans in rare cases.

References

Lactobacillales
Bacteria described in 2000